This is a list of fossiliferous stratigraphic units in Antarctica.



List of fossiliferous stratigraphic units

See also 

 Geology of Antarctica
 List of fossiliferous stratigraphic units in Namibia
 List of fossiliferous stratigraphic units in South Africa
 List of fossiliferous stratigraphic units in the Falkland Islands

References

Further reading 
 G. Arratia, R. Scasso, and W. Kiessling. 2004. Late Jurassic fishes from Longing Gap, Antarctic Peninsula. Journal of Vertebrate Paleontology 24(1):41-55
 A. C. Ashworth and G. Kuschel. 2003. Fossil weevils (Coleoptera: Curculionidae) from latitude 85 ˚S Antarctica. Palaeogeography, Palaeoclimatology, Palaeoecology 191:191-202
 R. A. Askin. 1990. Cryptogam spores from the upper Campanian and Maastrichtian of Seymour Island, Antarctica. Micropaleontology (36)141-156
 R. A. Askin. 1989. Endemism and heterochrony in the Late Cretaceous (Campanian) to Paleocene palynofloras of Seymour Island, Antarctica: implications for origins, dispersal and palaeoclimates of southern floras. Geological Society of America Special Paper (147)107-119
 V. D. Barreda, S. Palamarczuk, and F. Medina. 1999. Palinología de la Formación Hidden Lake (Coniaciano-Santoniano), Isla James Ross, Antártida. Revista Española de Micropaleontología (31)53-72
 M. A. Bitner and J. A. Crame. 2002. Brachiopods from the Lower Miocene of King George Island, West Antarctica. Polish Polar Research 23(1):75-84
 J. Blaszyk. 1987. Ostracods from the Oligocene Polonez Cove Formation of King George Island, West Antarctica. Palaeontologia Polonica 49:63-81
 M. A. Bradshaw and L. McCartan. 1991. Palaeoecology and systematics of Early Devonian bivalves from the Horlick Formation, Ohio Range, Antarctica. Alcheringa 15(1):1-42
 P. J. Butterworth, J. A. Crame, P. J. Howlett and D. I. M. Macdonald. 1988. Lithostratigraphy of Upper Jurassic-Lower Cretaceous strata of eastern Alexander Island, Antarctica. Cretaceous Research 9(3):249-264
 D. J. Cantrill and N. S. Nagalingum. 2005. Ferns from the Cretaceous of Alexander Island, Antarctica: Implications for Cretaceous phytogeography of the Southern Hemisphere. Review of Palaeobotany and Palynology
 F. M. Carpenter. 1969. Fossil insects from Antarctica. Psyche 76:418-425
 N. A. Clark, M. Williams, D. J. Hill, P. G. Quilty, J. L. Smellie, J. Zalasiewicz, M. J. Leng and M. A. Ellis. 2013. Fossil proxies of near-shore sea surface temperatures and seasonality from the late Neogene Antarctic shelf. Naturwissenschaften 100:699-722
 J. W. Collinson, D.C. Pennington, and N.R. Kemp. 1986. Stratigraphy and petrology of Permian and Triassic fluvial deposits in northern Victoria Land, Antarctica. Antarctic Research Series 46:211-242
 J. A. Crame. 1996. A new oxytomid bivalve from the Upper Jurassic-Lower Cretaceous of Antarctica. Palaeontology 39(3):615-628
 A. A. Cridland. 1963. A Glossopteris flora from the Ohio Range, Antarctica. American Journal of Botany 50:186-195
 F. Debrenne, A. Y. Rozanov, and G. F. Webers. 1984. Upper Cambrian archaeocyatha from Antarctica. Geological Magazine 121(4):291-299
 M. E. Dettmann and M. R. A. Thomson. 1987. Cretaceous palynomorphs from the James Ross Island area, Antarctica - A pilot Study. British Antarctic Survey Bulletin (77)13-59
 P. Doyle. 1987. The Cretaceous Dimitobelidae (Belemnitida) of the Antarctic Peninsula region. Palaeontology 30(1):147-177
 T. L. Dutra and D. J. Batten. 2000. Upper Cretaceous floras of King George Island, West Antarctica, and their palaeoenvironmental and phytogeographic implications. Cretaceous Research (21)181-209
 K. R. Evans. 1992. Marocella: Antarctic specimens of an enigmatic Cambrian animal. Journal of Paleontology 66(4):558-562
 R. E. Fordyce and P. G. Quilty. 1994. Pliocene whales and dolphins (Cetacea) from the Vestfold Hills, Antarctica. Records of the South Australian Museum 27(2):219
 A. Gazdzicki and H. Pugaczewska. 1984. Biota of the "Pecten Conglomerate" (Polenez Cove Formation, Pliocene) of King George Island (South Shetland Islands, Antarctica). Studia Geologica Polonica 79:59-120
 J. P. O'Gorman. 2012. The oldest elasmosaurs (Sauropterygia, Plesiosauria) from Antarctica, Santa Marta Formation (upper Coniacian? Santonian-upper Campanian) and Snow Hill Island Formation (upper Campanian-lower Maastrichtian), James Ross Island. Polar Research 31(11090):1-10
 W. R. Hammer, J. W. Collinson, R. A. Askin and W. J. Hickerson. 2004. The first Upper Triassic vertebrate locality in Antarctica. Gondwana Research 7(1):199-204
 D. C. H. Hikuroa. 2009. Second Jurassic marine reptile from the Antarctic Peninsula. Antarctic Science 21(2):169-170
 J. R. Ineson, J. A. Crame, and M. R. A. Thomson. 1986. Lithostratigraphy of the Cretaceous strata of west James Ross Island, Antarctica. Cretaceous Research 7:141-159
 S. R. A. Kelly, P. A. Doubleday, C. H. C. Brunton, J. M. Dickins, G. D. Sevastopulo and P. D. Taylor. 2001. First Carboniferous and ?Permian marine macrofaunas from Antarctica and their tectonic implications. Journal of the Geological Society of London 158(2):219-232
 S. R. A. Kelly. 1995. New trigonoid bivalves from the early Jurassic to earliest Cretaceous of the Antarctic Peninsula region: systematics and austral paleobiogeography. Journal of Paleontology 69(1):66-84
 S. R. A. Kelly and A. C. M. Moncrieff. 1992. Marine molluscan constraints on the age of Cretaceous fossil forests of Alexander Island, Antarctica. Geological Magazine 129(6):771-778
 S. R. A. Kelly and P. Doyle. 1991. The bivalve Aulacomyella from the Early Tithonian (Late Jurassic) of Antarctica . Antarctic Science 3(1):97-107
 W. Kiessling. 1999. Late Jurassic radiolarians from the Antarctic Peninsula. Micropaleontology 45(S1):1-96
 W. Kiessling, R. Scasso, A. Zeiss, A. Riccardi, and F. Medina. 1999. Combined radiolarian-ammonite stratigraphy for the Late Jurassic of the Antarctic Peninsula: Implications for radiolarian stratigraphy. Geodiversitas 21(4):687-713
 S. D. Klavins, E. L. Taylor, M. Krings and T. N. Taylor. 2001. An unusual, structurally preserved ovule from the Permian of Antarctica. Review of Palaeobotany and Palynology 115:107-117
 S. McLoughlin, S. Lindstrom, and A.N. Drinnan. 1997. Gondwanan floristic and sedimentological trends during the Permian-Triassic transition: new evidence from the Amery Group, northern Prince Charles Mountains, East Antarctica. Antarctic Science 9(3):281-298
 F. A. Medina, L. Buatois, and A. Lopez Angriman. 1992. Estratigrafia del Grupo Gustav en la Isla James Ross, Antartida. Geologia de la Isla James Ross 167-192
 R. E. Molnar, A. L. Angriman, and Z. Gasparini. 1996. An Antarctic Cretaceous theropod. Memoirs of the Queensland Museum 39(3):669-674
 D. Néraudeau, A. Crame, and M. Kooser. 2000. Upper Cretaceous echinoids from James Ross Basin, Antarctica. Géobios 33(4):455-466
 F. E. Novas, M. Fernández, Z. B. Gasparini, J. M. Lirio, H. J. Nuñez and P. Puerta. 2002. Lakumasaurus antarcticus, n. gen. et sp., a new mosasaur (Reptilia, Squamata) from the Upper Cretaceous of Antarctica. Ameghiniana 39(2):245-249
 R. A. Otero, S. Soto-Acuna, A. O. Vargas, D. Rubilar-Rogers, R. E. Yury-Yanez and C. S. Gutstein. 2013. Additions to the diversity of elasmosaurid plesiosaurs from the Upper Cretaceous of Antarctica. Gondwana Research
 A. R. Palmer and C. G. Gatehouse. 1972. Early and Middle Cambrian Trilobites from Antarctica. Contributions to the geology of Antarctica
 I. Poole, R. J. Hunt, and D. J. Cantrill. 2001. A fossil wood flora from King George Island: ecological implications for an Antarctic Eocene vegetation. Annals of Botany 88(1):33-54
 F. Quaglio, R. J. Whittle, A. Gazdzicki and M. G. Simoes. 2010. A new fossil Adamussium (Bivalvia: Pectinidae) from Antarctica. Polish polar research 31(4):291-302
 P. M. Rees and C. J. Cleal. 2004. Lower Jurassic floras from Hope Bay and Botany Bay, Antarctica. Special Papers in Palaeontology 72:5-90
 J. B. Riding and J. A. Crame. 2002. Aptian to Coniacian (Early–Late Cretaceous) palynostratigraphy of the Gustav Group, James Ross Basin, Antarctica. Cretaceous Research (23)739-760
 A. L. Rode, B.S. Lieberman, and A.J. Rowell. 2003. A new Early Cambrian bradoriid (Arthropoda) from East Antarctica. Journal of Paleontology 77(4):691-697
 M. R. Sandy. 1991. Cretaceous brachiopods from James Ross Island, Antarctic Peninsula, and their paleobiogeographic affinities. Journal of Paleontology 65(3):396-411
 A. B. Smith and T.H. Tranter. 1985. Protremaster, a new Lower Jurassic genus of asteroid from Antarctica. Geological Magazine 122(4):351-359
 B. Studencka. 1991. A new species of genus Panopea (Bivalvia) from King George Island, Antarctica. Polish polar research 12(3):363-368
 
 P. Tasch. 1973. Jurassic beetle from southern Victoria Land, Antarctica. Journal of Paleontology 47:590-592
 P. Tasch and E. F. Riek. 1969. Permian Insect Wing from Antarctic Sentinel Mountains. Science 164(3887):1529-1530
 T. N. Taylor and E. L. Taylor. 1992. Permian plants from the Ellsworth Mountains, West Antarctica. Geological Society of America Memoir 170:285-294
 E. L. Taylor, T.N. Taylor, J.L. Isbell and R. Cuneo. 1989. Fossil floras of southern Victoria Land. 2. Kennar Valley. Antarctic Journal U.S. 24:26-28
 E. I. Vera. 2010. Estudios anatómicos en paleofloras del Aptiano de Antártida y Patagonia, y su comparación. Universidad de Buenos Aires. Facultad de Ciencias Exactas y Naturales 294
 R. Vodrazka and L. A. Crame. 2011. First fossil sponge from Antarctica and its paleobiogeographical significance. Journal of Paleontology 85(1):48-57
 G. F. Webers, J. Pojeta, and E.L. Yochelson. 1992. Cambrian Mollusca from the Minaret Formation, Ellsworth Mountains, West Antarctica. Geological Society of America Memoir 170:181-248
 G. F. Webers, B. Glenister, J. Pojeta, Jr. and G. Young. 1992. Devonian fossils from the Ellsworth Mountains, West Antarctica. Geological Society of America Memoir 170:269-278
 R. Wolfart. 1994. Middle Cambrian Faunas (Brachiopoda, Mollusca, Trilobita) from Exotic Limestone Blocks, Reilly Ridge, North Victoria Land, Antarctica; their Biostratigraphic and Paleogeographic Significance. Geologisches Jahrbuch B/84:1-161
 R. Wrona. 2003. Early Cambrian molluscs from glacial erratics of King George Island, West Antarctica. Polish Polar Research 24(3-4):181-216
 E. L. Yochelson and E. Stump. 1977. Discovery of Early Cambrian fossils at Taylor Nunatak, Antarctica. Journal of Paleontology 51(4):872-875
 F. E. Zeuner. 1959. Jurassic beetles from Grahamland, Antarctica. Palaeontology 1:407-409

Antarctica
 
 
Antarctica-related lists
Geology-related lists